The Annie Jump Cannon Award in Astronomy is awarded annually by the American Astronomical Society (AAS) to a woman resident of North America, who is within five years of receipt of a PhD, for distinguished contributions to astronomy or for similar contributions in related sciences which have immediate application to astronomy. The awardee is invited to give a talk at an AAS meeting and is given a $1,500 honorarium. The award is named in honor of American astronomer Annie Jump Cannon.

Margaret Burbidge was due to be given the 1972 award, but she refused it on the grounds of gender discrimination, stating: "It is high time that discrimination in favor of, as well as against, women in professional life be removed". This prompted the AAS to set up its first committee on the status of women in astronomy and they ceased issuing the award directly. From 1973–2004 the American Association of University Women issued the awards, on advice from the AAS. The AAS resumed direct issuing of the award in 2005.

List of winners
Source: American Astronomical Society

See also

 List of astronomy awards
 List of women astronomers
 List of prizes, medals, and awards for women in science
 Prizes named after people

Notes

Astronomy prizes
Cannon
Awards established in 1934
1934 establishments in the United States
American Astronomical Society